The Leeward Islands are a group of islands situated where the northeastern Caribbean Sea meets the western Atlantic Ocean. Starting with the Virgin Islands east of Puerto Rico, they extend southeast to Guadeloupe and its dependencies. In English, the term Leeward Islands refers to the northern islands of the Lesser Antilles chain. The more southerly part of this chain, starting with Dominica, is called the Windward Islands. Dominica was originally considered a part of the Leeward Islands, but was transferred from the British Leeward Islands to the British Windward Islands in 1940.

Origin of the name

The name of this island group, Leeward Islands, dates from previous centuries, when sailing ships were the sole form of transportation across the Atlantic Ocean. In sailing terminology, 'windward' means towards the source of the wind (upwind), while 'leeward' is the opposite direction (downwind). In the West Indies, the prevailing winds, known as the trade winds, blow predominantly out of the northeast. Therefore, a sailing vessel departing from the British Gold Coast and the Gulf of Guinea, driven by the trade winds, would normally first encounter Dominica and Martinique, islands most to windward, in their west-northwesterly heading to the final destinations in the Caribbean, Central America, and Northern America. This location, Dominica and Martinique, becomes the rough dividing line between the Windward Islands and the Leeward Islands.

The early Spanish colonizers called Puerto Rico and the islands to the west Sotavento, meaning 'leeward'. The islands to the south and east of Puerto Rico were then called Islas de Barlovento, meaning 'windward islands'. When the British gained control of many of the Lesser Antilles, they designated Antigua, Montserrat and the islands to the north as the 'Leeward Islands'. Guadeloupe and the islands to the south were designated as the 'Windward Islands'. Later on, all islands north of Martinique became known as the Leeward Islands. Dominica was transferred to the British Windward Islands in 1940, and is now considered to be part of the Windward Islands.

However, even in modern usage in languages other than English, notably, Dutch, French, and Spanish, all of the Lesser Antilles from the Virgin Islands to Trinidad and Tobago are known as 'the Windward Islands' (Bovenwindse Eilanden in Dutch, Îles du Vent in French, and Islas de Barlovento in Spanish). The ABC islands and the other islands along the Venezuelan coast, known in English as the Leeward Antilles, are known in languages other than English as 'the Leeward Islands'.

According to the Fijian language dictionary, published in 1872, it is stated that the Leeward Islands were called "Ra" during that time.

Geography

The islands are affected by active volcanism, and notable eruptions have occurred in Montserrat in the 1990s and in 2009 to 2010. At , the highest point is La Grande Soufrière in Guadeloupe.

History
The Caribs, after whom the Caribbean is named, are believed to have migrated from the Orinoco River area in Venezuela in South America to settle in the Caribbean islands about 1200 AD, according to carbon dating. Over the century leading up to Columbus' arrival in the Caribbean archipelago in 1492, the Caribs mostly displaced the Maipurean-speaking Taínos, who settled the island chains earlier in history, by warfare, extermination and assimilation.

The islands were among the first parts of the Americas to fall under the control of the Spanish Empire. European contact commenced with Christopher Columbus's second voyage; many of the islands' names originate from this period: Montserrat was named in honour of Santa Maria de Montserrat (Our Lady of Montserrat), after the Blessed Virgin of the Monastery of Montserrat, which is located on the Mountain of Montserrat, the national shrine of Catalonia. 'Mont serrat' in Catalan means 'saw mountain', referring to the serrated appearance of the mountain range.

British colony of the Leeward Islands

The Leeward Islands became a British colony in 1671, with William Stapleton as its first governor.

Although comparatively much smaller than the surrounding islands in the Caribbean, the Leeward Islands posed the most significant rebellion to the British Stamp Act, though it was decidedly less severe in comparison to that of the mainland North American colonies.

In 1660, there were about 8,000 white settlers and approximately 2,000 African slaves in the Leeward Islands. However, that ratio narrowed over succeeding years. In 1678, there were 10,408 white settlers and 8,449 black slaves. By 1708, there was a huge disparity between the number of white settlers, which had declined to 7,311, while the number of black slaves was estimated at 23,500.

In 1816, the colony as a federation of islands was dissolved, and the individual islands were ruled individually. However, the colony of the Leeward Islands was re-established in 1833.

List of notable islands in the Leeward Islands 
There are two countries and eleven territories in the Leeward Islands. From the northwest to the southeast, the main islands are:

 Virgin Islands 
  Spanish (Puerto Rican) Islands (Puerto Rico)
  (Municipality of Puerto Rico)
  (Municipality of Puerto Rico)
  (United States)
 Saint Thomas
 Saint John
 Saint Croix
 Water Island
  (United Kingdom)
 Jost Van Dyke
 Tortola
 Virgin Gorda
 Anegada
  (United Kingdom)
 Saint Martin Island
 Saint Martin (France)
  (Netherlands)
  (France)
  (Netherlands)
  (Netherlands)
 
 
 
 
  Barbuda
  Antigua
  Redonda — uninhabited
  (United Kingdom)
  (France)
 La Désirade (dependency of Guadeloupe) — literally 'The Desired', also called La Deseada
 Îles des Saintes (dependency of Guadeloupe)
 Marie-Galante (dependency of Guadeloupe)

See also

 Leeward Islands moist forests
 British Leeward Islands
 Leeward Antilles
 Leeward Islands Cricket Association
 Leeward Islands cricket team
 Lesser Antilles
 
 
 
 Southern Caribbean
 Windward Islands

References

Further reading
 Jeppe Mulich. 2020. In a Sea of Empires: Networks and Crossings in the Revolutionary Caribbean. Cambridge University Press.

External links

 Digital Library of the Caribbean−dloc.org: "The Leeward Islands Gazette"—freely−openly available, with full page images and searchable text
 Digital Library of the Caribbean−dloc.org: "Antigua, Montserrat and Virgin Islands Gazette"—openly−freely available, with searchable text and full page images

 

Archipelagoes of the Caribbean Sea